Ettore Cunial (November 16, 1905 – October 6, 2005) was an Italian prelate.

Born at Possagno in the Province of Treviso, Cunial was ordained priest in 1929. In 1953, his appointment as Titular Archbishop of Soteropolis and Vicegerent of Rome followed. He was appointed Vice-Chamberlain of the Roman Catholic Church by Pope Paul VI in 1976, and did not retire until October 23, 2004, even though the customary retirement age for the Roman Curia is 75, and very few are permitted by exception to remain in office past 80.

In February 2005 the death of Corrado Bafile left Cunial the oldest Catholic bishop in the world. Cunial died on October 6, 2005 at Possagno just six weeks before he would have turned 100.

References 

1905 births
2005 deaths
People from the Province of Treviso
20th-century Italian Roman Catholic titular archbishops
Participants in the Second Vatican Council